Cristian Șchiopu (born 19 January 1974) is a Romanian former football player who played as a central back for Foresta Fălticeni and Farul Constanța.

Honours

Club
Foresta Suceava
 Liga II: 1996–97, 1999–00

External links

1974 births
Living people
People from Fălticeni
Romanian footballers
Association football defenders
Liga I players
Liga II players
FCV Farul Constanța players